The Agriculture and Forestry University (AFU) is a public agricultural university with central offices in Rampur, Chitwan, Nepal. It was created by the Parliament of Nepal through a bill passed in June 2010 merging two constituent campuses of Tribhuvan University: the Rampur Agriculture Campus of the Institute of Agriculture and Animal Science and the Forestry Campus, Hetauda of the Institute of Forestry in Hetauda, Makwanpur. The university offers agricultural workforce development and promotes research in agriculture, forestry, and allied disciplines through teaching, research, and extension programms across the country. The Main Features of AFU is to produce mainpower for agriculture and forest industry.

Academics
The university offers undergraduate, graduate and PhD programs in agricultural sciences from Faculty of Agriculture and Faculty of Animal Sciences, Veterinary and Fisheries, Rampur and undergraduate program in forestry from Faculty of Forestry, Hetauda. The Faculties of Agriculture and Animal Sciences, Veterinary, and Fisheries offer undergraduate degrees including a four-year BSc Ag, five-year B.V.Sc. and A.H, four-year BSc Fisheries, two-year master programs in Agriculture, Animal Science, Veterinary Science and Aquaculture, and PhD programs. In addition to its Bachelor of Forestry degree program, the Faculty of Forestry offers a Master of Forestry degree and PhD

The university has 140 faculty members located in Rampur premises and 55 at the Faculty of Forestry, Hetauda. The university strength consists of around 1500 undergraduate students, 200 postgraduate students and around 50 PhD scholars in disciplines of agriculture and forestry.

The faculty members focus their research work on productivity of agricultural commodities, post-harvest technology, improving the shelf-life of food products, conserving biodiversity, and enhancing livelihood systems and innovation capacities of farming communities. The postgraduate students are contributing thesis research to generate knowledge and technologies to address the issues of agriculture and forestry in the nation.

History
Agriculture and Forestry University (AFU) was established as a result of a bill enacted by the Nepalese Parliament in June 2010 authorizing the creation of three new universities at campuses owned by Tribhuvan University. The Rampur Agriculture Campus, associated with the Institute of Agriculture and Animal Science, and the Forestry Campus, Hetauda, associated with the Institute of Forestry, were designated as campuses for the new university. As of February 2015, Tribhuvan University has refused to transfer ownership of the campuses to the new university, citing its autonomy from the Nepalese legislature, and the existing Rampur Agriculture Campus has yet to vacate its administrative offices.

Recently, in 2015, the first AFU affiliated college was established in Puranchaur V.D.C. of Kaski district with the name College of Natural Resource Management. This college is currently operating with bachelor's degree in Agriculture. Total 50 students were enrolled as the first batch of the college.

Campuses
Faculty of Agriculture, Rampur, Chitwan
Faculty of Animal Sciences, veterinary and Fisheries, Rampur, Chitwan
Faculty of Forestry, Hetauda, Makawanpur
College of Natural Resource Management, Puranchaur, Kaski
College of Natural Resource Management, kapilakot, Sindhuli
College of Natural Resource Management, Pakhribas, Dhankuta
College of Natural Resource Management, Tikapur, Kailali
College of Natural Resource Management, Bardibas, Mahottari
College of Natural Resource Management, Katari, Udayapur
College of Natural Resource Management, Madichaur, Rolpa

The University Complex of AFU and its Central Office, including the offices of the Vice-Chancellor and Registrar, are Located at Rampur, Chitwan.

Faculty of Forestry, Hetauda, Makawanpur
Located at Hetauda City, the Faculty of Forestry is one of the three departments under Agriculture and Forestry University. The dean's office is also located on the Hetauda campus. Late Ramesh Kumar Pandey was the pioneer dean of this faculty whereas Balaram Bhatta, PhD is the current Dean and Bashudev Pokharel is the vice-dean of the Faculty of Forestry. This campus conducts Undergraduate and Graduate courses in Forestry Science in Hetauda. There are limited seats available for both bachelor's and master's degrees. Students are selected on a merit-based annual entrance examination, a highly competitive one. Hence, the annual intake for undergraduate study in Hetauda Forestry college is just 85, 80 from regular and 5 from departments.

References

External links 

Draft Proposal of Agriculture and Forestry University
ACT OF AGRICULTURE AND FORESTRY UNIVERSITY

Agricultural universities and colleges in Nepal
Forestry in Nepal
Forestry education
Educational institutions established in 2010
2010 establishments in Nepal
Universities and colleges in Nepal